SSNIT Flats is a community in Tamale Metropolitan District in the Northern Region of Ghana. It is enclosed in the village of Fuo.

See also
Kalpohin Estate

References 

Communities in Ghana
Suburbs of Tamale, Ghana